Levi Reed (December 31, 1814 – October 18, 1869) was an American politician who served as Auditor of the Commonwealth of Massachusetts.

Bibliography
New England Historic Genealogical Society Memorial Biographies of New England Historic Genealogical Society, 1853-1855, Pages 357-358, (1905)

Footnotes

Republican Party Massachusetts state senators
State auditors of Massachusetts
People from Abington, Massachusetts
1814 births
1869 deaths
19th-century American politicians